Llanwrda is both a village and a community in Carmarthenshire, Wales,  southwest of Llandovery. It lies on the River Towy. The population in 2011 was 514.

Transport and other features 
The village is served by Llanwrda railway station.

The south end of the community is intersected by the A40 road between Llandeilo and Llandovery and the village stands at the junction of this road with the A482 to Lampeter and Aberaeron. The community is bordered by the Carmarthenshire communities of: Cynwyl Gaeo; Cilycwm; Llandovery; Myddfai; and Llansadwrn.

6 miles from the village centre are the Dolaucothi Gold Mines.

Notable people 
 Sir John Powell (ca.1632 – 1696), a Welsh judge on the Court of Common Pleas and the Court of King's Bench.
 Thomas Johns (1836–1914), a Welsh Independent (Congregationalist) minister
and
It has been claimed that the church is the last resting-place of Owain Glyndŵr, the last native Welshman to hold the title of Prince of Wales.

References

External links 
 The village and community of Llanwrda
 GENUKI page
 www.geograph.co.uk : photos of Llanwrda and surrounding area
 Brief description & links
 

Villages in Carmarthenshire
Communities in Carmarthenshire